Against All Odds: Music from the Original Motion Picture Soundtrack is the soundtrack for the 1984 film Against All Odds.

The album includes the original score by Larry Carlton, as well as several tracks by artists popular at the time of the film's release. Best known of the tracks is "Against All Odds (Take a Look at Me Now)", a Phil Collins single which topped the Billboard Hot 100 song chart and became Collins's first American number one song. It gave him a Grammy Award for Best Pop Vocal Performance, Male and another nomination for Song of the Year. The song received an Academy Award nomination for Best Original Song as well as a Golden Globe Award nomination for Best Original Song.

Other prior and current members of Genesis, guitarist Mike Rutherford and former lead vocalist Peter Gabriel, also contribute tracks. The album received a Grammy Award nomination for Best Album of Original Score Written for a Motion Picture or a Television Special in 1985.

Track listing

Personnel
Phil Collins - vocals, drums (track 1)

Charts

References

1984 soundtrack albums
Thriller film soundtracks
Virgin Records soundtracks
Atlantic Records soundtracks